Traditional Swedish units of measurement were standardized by law in 1665, prior to which they only existed as a number of related but differing local variants. The system was slightly revised in 1735. In 1855, a decimal reform was instituted that defined a new Swedish inch as  Swedish foot. Up to the middle of the 19th century, there was a law allowing the imposition of the death penalty for falsifying weights or measures. Sweden adopted the metric system in 1889, after a decision by the parliament in 1875 and a ten-year transition period from 1879.

Old length units 
The Swedish units of length included the following:
 aln – "forearm" (cf. ell) (pl. alnar). After 1863, . Before that, from 1605, 59.38 cm as defined by King Carl IX of Sweden in Norrköping 1604, based on Rydaholmsalnen.
 famn – "fathom", 3 alnar.
 fot – "foot",  aln.
 kvarter – "quarter",  aln.
 tum or verktum – "inch",  kvarter or  fot, making it .
 linje – "line", after 1863  tum, . Before that,  tum or 2.06 mm.
 mil – "mile", also lantmil. The unified mile was meant to define the suitable distance between inns. After the 1889 metric conversion the Swedish mil is defined as exactly 10 kilometers.
 nymil – "new mile" from 1889, 10 km exactly. Commonly used to this day, only referred to as mil.
 kyndemil – the distance a torch will last, approx .
 skogsmil, rast – distance between rests in the woods, approx. . 
 fjärdingsväg –  mil.
 rev – 160 fot, for land measurement, was 100 fot after 1855.
 stång – 16 fot, for land measurement.
 tum – "thumb" (inch),  fot, . After 1863  fot, 2.96 cm, not much accepted by professional users in mechanics and carpentry who later switched to English inch (2.54 cm, abandoned only late 20th century) and metric system.
 tvärhand – "hand", .

Old area units 
 kannaland – 1000 fot 2, or 
 kappland – .
 spannland – 16 kappland
 kvadratmil – Square mil, 36 million square favnar, from 1739.
 hektar - 100x100m, still commonly used for land area of farms.

Old volume units

Old weight units 
 mark – 1/2 skålpund. Was used from the Viking era, when it was approx. .

Nautical units still in use

Old monetary units 
 daler – From 1534, Swedish thaler. From 1873, replaced by the krona. 
 riksdaler – From 1624,  daler, from 1681 2 daler, from 1715 3 daler, from 1776 6 daler
 skilling – From 1776,  riksdaler
 mark – From 1534,  daler. From 1604,  daler.
 öre – From 1534,  mark. Subsequently replaced by the skilling, but from 1855 reintroduced as  riksdaler.

See also 
 Historical weights and measures
 Petrograd Standard
 SI
 Weights and measures

References

External links 
 Scandinavian units
 Swedish units

Systems of units
Science and technology in Sweden
Units of measurement by country